Litoreibacter janthinus is a Gram-negative, strictly aerobic and non-motile bacterium from the genus of Litoreibacter which has been isolated from sediments from the Sea of Japan.

References 

Rhodobacteraceae
Bacteria described in 2011